Alexander Forbes (1564–1617) was a late 16th-century and early 17th-century senior Church of Scotland figure who was a Protestant Bishop of Aberdeen.

Life

Born around 1564, he was the son of Helen Graham and her husband John Forbes of Ardmurdo House in the parish of Kinkell, Aberdeenshire near Inverurie.

He graduated with a Master of Arts degree in 1585 from the University of St Andrews, becoming minister of Fettercairn in the Mearns in 1588, using this position to take an active role in the church politics of the day. As a result, on 22 November 1604, he became Bishop of Caithness, retaining control of Fettercairn, something which created animosity with the anti-episcopal section of the Church of Scotland. Forbes took part in most national church meetings in this period, and was part of the meeting at Glasgow in 1610 which restored the old authority and powers of bishops. It was in the following year that he was finally consecrated as a bishop, in Brechin Cathedral.

He was alleged to have granted the consent of the Scottish church, dishonestly, to the absolution of the Catholic magnate, George Gordon, 1st Marquess of Huntly, carried out on the king's wishes by the Archbishop of Canterbury. It was perhaps for this reason that, in 1616, Forbes was translated as Bishop of Aberdeen in place of Bishop Blackburn. This position brought him the Chancellorship of King's College, Aberdeen. Forbes, however, attempted and failed to succeed George Gledstanes to the Archbishopric of St Andrews, a position he was beaten to by John Spottiswoode.

He died in Leith,  near Edinburgh, on 14 December 1617, a figure of hate amongst the hard-line presbyterian section of the Scottish church.

Family

He married Christian  Straton of Crigie, and had ten children:

William Forbes, their heir
Col. Alexander Forbes
John Forbes, parson at Auchterlea
Captain Arthur Forbes
George
Bernard
Margaret or Marjory, married Andrew Straton of Warburton, a cousin
Isobel, married George Forbes of Athallan
Jean, married Robert Leighton of Usan

References

 Cooper, James, "Forbes, Alexander (1564–1617)", rev. A. S. Wayne Pearce, in the Oxford Dictionary of National Biography, Oxford University Press, 2004 , accessed 23 Feb 2007. 
 Keith, Robert, An Historical Catalogue of the Scottish Bishops: Down to the Year 1688, (London, 1924)

1564 births
1617 deaths
Alumni of the University of St Andrews
Bishops of Aberdeen
Bishops of Caithness
Chancellors of the University of Aberdeen
Members of the Parliament of Scotland 1612
Members of the Convention of the Estates of Scotland 1617
Members of the Parliament of Scotland 1617
17th-century bishops of the Church of Scotland
Scottish bishops 1560–1638